Khomeys (also known as Khomeys-e Sa‘d and Khomeys-e Sheykh Sa‘ad) is a village in Seyyed Abbas Rural District, Shavur District, Shush County, Khuzestan Province, Iran. At the 2006 census, its population was 257, in 40 families.

References 

Populated places in Shush County